Coleby is a hamlet in the  civil parish of West Halton  in North Lincolnshire, England.

Coleby pre-dates the Norman Conquest, its name derived from Old Norse meaning the "farmstead of a man named Koli". It was described in the Domesday Book.

Coleby has 28 dwellings including 3 farms: Eastdale Farm, Hall Farm and Manor Farm. The village has allotments, but no shops or public houses, and its telephone box was removed in 2008. Public Transport is provided by Stagecoach Lincolnshire and subsidised by North Lincolnshire Council.

Internet is delivered by ADSL through underground, waxed-paper insulated copper wires that were laid by the GPO in 1955. FTTC is not yet available because the cabinet is too far away. As of July 2018, FTTP/Ultrafast broadband is now available in the village with a speed guarantee of at least 100Mb with ULTRAFAST FIBRE 2 PLUS Average speed 300Mb from BT.

References

External links

Google Street view

Hamlets in Lincolnshire
Borough of North Lincolnshire